The Postal and Courier Services Regulatory Commission is a Government of Ghana established commission with the purpose of serving the official body for the licensing and regulation of the operations of postal and courier services in Ghana.

References

Postal system of Ghana